Melissa McClelland is Melissa McClelland's first album. The album was released in 2001 in Canada by Daddy Warbucks Records.

Track listing
All songs written by Melissa McClelland except as noted

"Past Lives" – 2:20
"It Comes and Goes" – 3:03
"What If" – 3:59
"Whisper" – 4:20
"Yesterday" – 3:55
"Silence" – 3:30
"Murder Inc." – 4:27
"Garden of Eden" – 3:16
"I'm Leaving You (Part 1)" – 3:22
"I'm Leaving You (Part 2)" – 3:02
"Dreaming Awake" (Anne Alma) – 3:10

Personnel
Melissa McClelland: vocals, backup vocals, guitars, xylophone, organ
Rob Lamothe: backup vocals, guitars, keyboards, organ
Mike Maxymuik: drums
Jay Gordon: bass guitar
Stuart Marshall: bass guitar on track 3
Brad Newberry: bass guitar on track 1
Serdjo Lakich: lead guitar
Sahra Hutchings: violin, flute
Vera Lees: accordion
Jamie Oakes: guitar on track 4
Lisa Winn: backup vocals
Ali Bartlett: backup vocals
Bob Doidge: cello
Paul Inston: strings, acoustic bass guitar
Zander Lamothe: hand drum

2001 albums
Melissa McClelland albums